Éder is a Portuguese and Spanish given name. Notable people with the name include:

Éder Aleixo, Brazilian international footballer featured in 1982 World Cup
Éder (footballer, born 1986), Brazilian-born Italian footballer, full name Éder Citadin Martins
Éder Gaúcho (born 1977), Brazilian football defender
Éder Bonfim, Brazilian footballer
Éder Monteiro (born 1983), Brazilian footballer
Éder Lima (footballer, born 1987), Brazilian footballer
Eder (footballer, born 1987), as Ederzito António Macedo Lopes
Éder (footballer, born 1988), Edson Correia de Araujo, Brazilian football defensive midfielder
Éder Militão (born 1998), Brazilian footballer

See also
Eder (disambiguation)
Ederson (disambiguation)

Portuguese masculine given names